Jean-Baptiste Alexandre Mardelle (1 February 1785 – 1 September 1839) was an early 19th-century French playwright and novelist.

A NCO, he left the army in 1815 to devote himself to literature. His plays were presented at the Théâtre du Vaudeville and the Théâtre de l'Ambigu-Comique.

Works 
1798: Arlequin journaliste, comedy in 1 act, in prose, mingled with vaudevilles, with René de Chazet and Emmanuel Dupaty
1807: Baudoin, comte de Provence ou le retour des croisades, melodrama in 3 acts
1810: Frédéric, Duc de Nevers, melodrama in 3 acts, with E. F. Varez
1818: Les Princes norwégiens, ou le Fraticide supposé
1819: Les Ruines de Rothembourg
1822: L'aveugle de Valence, ou L'ermitage de Roquebrune, 5 vols.
1829: La chute d'un grand homme, 3 vols.
1830: Gustave Wasa, ou La Suède au seizième siècle, 5 vols.
1836: La Petite maison d'Auteuil
1836: La Croix de pierre

19th-century French dramatists and playwrights
19th-century French novelists
1785 births
People from Versailles
1839 deaths